Jimmy Wayne Teal (born  August 18, 1962) is a former American football wide receiver in the National Football League who played for the Buffalo Bills and Seattle Seahawks. He played college football for the Texas A&M Aggies.

References

1962 births
Living people
American football wide receivers
Buffalo Bills players
National Football League replacement players
People from Lufkin, Texas
Players of American football from Texas
Seattle Seahawks players
Texas A&M Aggies football players